The 2019 European Women's U-17 Handball Championship was the 14th edition, which took place in Celje, Slovenia.

Qualification

Draw 
The draw was held on 28 February 2019 in Celje.

Preliminary round 
All times are local (UTC+2).

Group A

Group B

Group C

Group D

Intermediate round

Group III

Group IV

Main round

Group I

Group II

Final round

Bracket 

Championship bracket

9th place bracket

5th place bracket

13th place bracket

13–16th place semifinals

9–12th place semifinals

5–8th place semifinals

Semifinals

15th place game

13th place game

Eleventh place game

Ninth place game

Seventh place game

Fifth place game

Third place game

Final

Final ranking

Tournament awards 
The all-star team and awards were announced on 11 August 2019.

All-star team

Awards

References

External links 
 

European Women's U-17 Handball Championship
European Women's U-17 Handball Championship
International handball competitions hosted by Slovenia
European U-17
European Women's U-17 Handball Championship
Sport in Celje
2019 in Slovenian women's sport